The Substitute Bride is the 6th season of the Precious Hearts Romances Presents series. It stars Paw Diaz, Rafael Rosell and Carla Humphries.

Plot 

This episode begins after Wilda's auntie died, when an unexpected driver leaves her auntie dead on the road. Wilda Abrantes now 23, and living presently in 2010, is an unemployed graduate. She seeks help in the classified ads, so she can find a job. She leads herself into the Guttierez engineering firm, but her cousin, who was a recent secretary, tells her the needs and wants of Mr. Guttierez. Also, no one can fall in love with him, and they never last one day, one week, or one month or even a year, after he tricks them into falling in love with him. So Wilda plans on becoming a secretary to show him what he has got. She immediately gets accepted, as she becomes the 24-year-old Wilda Abrantes, and does not even fall for his charms. However, secretly then as months go by, and now 9 months later, Wilda and Brent start falling in love, after a recent conversation on top of the roof's terrace. They have a lovely coffee date before leaving work. This leads to their romance, but both hide their feelings. A few days later, Candra (Carla Humphries) comes home and is in an arranged marriage with Brent, but Wilda finds out Candra is the daughter of the man who left her auntie 7 years ago on the road dead, after running her over. So, she decides to hide her identity as a secretary, but as Brent fights his feelings back, he then unexpectedly gets left by Candra, and unexpectedly Wilda is called in to be his substitute bride. Brent's mother, who already loves Wilda, agrees, even though Candra left. However, as they live a happily ever after, Candra returns, and her father as she does not like what she sees. One night Brent rescues her, and after everything is at peace, they fall in love and live happily ever after, and now both believe that love does end with one.

Cast and characters

Main cast
 Paw Diaz as Wilda Albantes
 Rafael Rosell as Brent Guttierez 
Carla Humphries as Candra Dela Rosa

Supporting cast
Ricardo Cepeda as Armando Guttierez
Melissa Mendez as Josie Lopez-Guttierez
Soliman Cruz as Peping Albantes
Frances Ignacio as Elena Albantes
Lorenzo Mara as Hector Dela Rosa
Cara Eriguel as Rory
Manuel Chua as Carlo
JM De Guzman as Jimmy

Guest cast
Julia Montes as Young Wilda
Cheska Ortega as Young Candra
Nikko Buenviaje as Teen Brent
Justin Cuyugan as Sam
Dionne Monsanto as Agnes

See also
Precious Hearts Romances Presents

References

ABS-CBN drama series
2010 Philippine television series debuts
2010 Philippine television series endings
Philippine romantic comedy television series
Television shows based on books
Filipino-language television shows
Television shows filmed in the Philippines